Calvert Hall College High School (also known as "Calvert Hall" or "CHC") is a Catholic college preparatory high school for boys, located in Towson, Maryland, United States. The school's mission is to make its students "men of intellect, men of faith, and men of integrity."   It is located in the Roman Catholic Archdiocese of Baltimore, the first Catholic diocese founded in the Western Hemisphere in 1789.

The school was established in 1845 by the Institute of the Brothers of the Christian Schools as a Catholic college preparatory high school for boys and is the oldest Christian Brothers school in the United States. The third oldest, La Salle Academy in New York City was founded by Christian Brothers from this school in 1848. Among its academic offerings is the McMullen Scholars Program, a four-year advanced-level curriculum requiring extra coursework in humanities, rhetoric and logic, and a senior independent project. Additionally, a program for assisting students with learning differences exists (the La Salle program).

History
At the request of Archbishop Samuel Eccleston, who wished to provide a Catholic school for boys in the Archdiocese of Baltimore, the Brothers of the Christian Schools in Canada provided training for English-speaking candidates to become members of their order.

Once they had taken their vows, the new Brothers, led by Baltimore native Brother Francis McMullen, FSC, returned to the Archdiocese and attended the first Mass on September 15, 1845 with 100 students to commemorate the opening of what would become known as Calvert Hall College High School, the first school founded by the Institute of the Brothers of the Christian Schools in the United States.

Initially, the school was located in the parish hall of the former St. Peter's Pro-Cathedralbut a rise in enrollment led to the purchase of property at Cathedral and Mulberry Streets, which was dedicated by Cardinal James Gibbons in 1891.

Calvert Hall moved again in September 1960, under the direction of Brother Gabriel Cannon, FSC, to its current Towson location. Throughout the next five decades, Calvert Hall continued to expand, adding additional buildings which provide space for academics, technology, and extracurricular activities, as well as renovating old spaces to maintain high quality facilities.

Academics

Students at Calvert Hall experience a college preparatory curriculum, operating on a cascading six-day schedule. The schedule is fit with individual learning opportunities, during which students can choose to eat lunch, study, or meet with an available teacher. The free periods provide flexibility and allow students to develop effective time management skills.  In addition, Calvert Hall uses a team teaching philosophy and a lecture-seminar format to mimic a university lecture system. Lectures are held in lecture halls that are equipped with multimedia presentation capabilities while seminars take place in classrooms centered on student learning.

Students are required to take four years of English, Social Studies, and Religion; three years of Mathematics and a Laboratory Science; and two years of Foreign Language and Physical Education/Health. Freshmen must take a year of Computer Applications while Sophomores are required to take a Fine Art.  Electives, which include Introduction to Engineering, Forensic Science, and Personal Finance among others, are offered in all departments. A total of four elective units are a graduation requirement.

The school offers honors courses in most subjects and over twenty Advanced Placement classes. Students who score well on their entrance test and display an outstanding application are invited to interview for the McMullen Scholars Program, which " focuses on an appreciation of the Humanities as a basis for a Christian humanist education" and is headed by its own director.

Scholars are required to complete an independent project their senior year as well as participate in various activities within the program that demonstrate an appreciation for the Arts. Likewise, students with identified language learning disabilities can apply for the La Salle Program which has its own director and five learning specialists who meet with students everyday to address development of skills and "increase each student's understanding of his learning strengths".

Students who maintain a certain GPA and have been involved in service to the school for two years are invited to apply to the school's chapter of the National Honor Society. If they are admitted to the program, they are required to help at Orientation, Back to School Night, and Open House, as well as serve as tutors in the school's Academic Resource Center, which is staffed by a teacher during every class period.

Besides the Academic Resource Center, the school offers the George Young Library, complete with numerous on-line resources and 22,000 volumes, a Mathematics Resource Center staffed with a math teacher each period for one-on-one help, in addition to a Counseling Center where each student is assigned one of five guidance counselors and one of three college counselors. The campus also features the John G. Noppinger, Jr. '64 Commons, a large space in which students can work on assignments, as well as collaborate with students on group assignments, projects, etc. The Commons was constructed in June, 2015, and it opened for students in September, 2015.

Athletics

In one of the oldest Catholic school football rivalries in the country, dating back to 1920, Calvert Hall faces its arch-rival, Loyola Blakefield, in the annual Turkey Bowl game at M&T Bank Stadium in Baltimore. Before M&T Bank Stadium was opened, the game was played at the old  Memorial Stadium. CHC participates in the Maryland Interscholastic Athletic Association 'A' conference in all its sports, along with the Baltimore Catholic League for basketball.

Calvert Hall's team sports program includes baseball, cross country, water polo, lacrosse, rugby, football, swimming, and more recently, hockey. The Calvert Hall baseball team has won the previous  conference championships including a 4–2 victory over Gilman in 2013. On March 18, 2008 moved up to the #1 team ranking by USA Today in high school baseball.

On April 7, 2008, the school's Carlo Crispino Baseball Stadium was dedicated. Named after an alumnus of that name who donated $1 million for the state-of-the-art facility, the stadium has a covered grandstand and FieldTurf, designed by Cal Ripken. Other former Baltimore Orioles attending the ceremonies were Bill Ripken and Billy Hunter.

The water polo squad has won every MIAA championship with the exception of the inaugural game in 2000, which was won by the Gilman School and in 2009 when they lost to Loyola Blakefield. Calvert Hall Varsity water polo has gone undefeated in the MIAA for the last seven years.  Calvert Hall has also had success in the Eastern Prep Championships of water polo, winning the last three, at the Lawrenceville School in New Jersey.

Calvert Hall is also represented in tennis, cross country, lacrosse, soccer, volleyball, hockey, indoor track and field, outdoor track and field, rugby, golf, wrestling, swimming, basketball, and by their competitive marching band.

The Calvert Hall basketball team ended the 1981–82 season as National Champions. The team was ranked #1 after defeating Dunbar High School in a triple overtime thriller the previous season.

The Calvert Hall lacrosse team was ranked #2 nationwide by Lax Power at the end of the 2011-12 after winning the MIAA championship against Loyola 17–3. They were ranked #3 before the 2012–2013 season and fell 12–10 to then #1 Boy's Latin in the semi-finals of the MIAA playoffs. The Calvert Hall hockey team won the MIAA championship between 2008 and 2010, in addition to winning the MAPHL Maryland State Championship in 2009.

Band
In existence for nearly 50 years, the Band performs numerous times during the year including local parades, home football games, and the Turkey Bowl. The Band is overseen by the Director of Bands, in addition to an Associate and Assistant Director.

The Calvert Hall Instrumental Music Department features 3 Jazz Bands, a Jazz Combo, 3 Concert Bands, and 2 Marching Bands. The CHC competitive marching band was named the 2004 & 2005 Tournament of Bands Group IV, Chapter V Champions, the 2016, 2021, and 2022 USBands Group II Open National Champions, as well as the 2017, 2018, and 2019 Group III Open National Champions.

On January 7, 2009, the band was named the Bowl Games of America's Band Championship Series National Champions.

Presidents
 Br. G. Leonard FSC, 1924-1927
 Br. Felician John FSC, 1927-1930
 Br. Eliseus Vincent Hurley FSC, 1930-1933
 Br. Edewald James Conaghan FSC, 1940-1944
 Br. Daniel Henry Barry FSC, 1946-1950
 Br. Kevin Strong FSC, 1990-2000
 Br. Kevin Stanton FSC, 2000-2005
 Br. Benedict Oliver FSC, 2005-2009
 Br. Thomas Zoppo FSC, 2009-2013
 Mr. Frank Bramble, 2013–2014 (Interim) 
 Br. John Kane, FSC, 2014–present

Notable alumni

 Adrian Amos, defensive back for NFL's Green Bay Packers
 Mario Armstrong, talk show host
 John S. Arnick, member of the Maryland House of Delegates
 Michael Barr, software expert witness
 Dave Boswell, Major League Baseball pitcher, 1964-71
 Lawrence Cager, NFL Player
 James Collins, Band Leader, founder of the group Fertile Ground, Meyerhoff Scholar
 Casey Connor, professional lacrosse player
 Juan Dixon, NBA player, Most Outstanding Player for 2002 NCAA champion Maryland Terrapins; head coach at Coppin State
 Patrick Ellis, former president, Catholic University of America and La Salle University
 Duane Ferrell, former NBA player
Justin Gorham (born 1998), basketball player in the Israeli Basketball Premier League
 Louis Hamman (1877–1946), American physician
 Patrick Healey, former Baltimore Blast player, Harrisburg Heat coach, former USMNT Futsal captain
Chance Campbell, football player
 Vincent Hebeka, president of the Johns Hopkins University Rothstein School of Communications and Musical Studies
 Kevin Huntley, professional lacrosse player
 Mel Kiper Jr., ESPN football analyst
 Damion Lee, basketball player
 Joseph Lutz, member of the Maryland House of Delegates
 Joseph Maskell (1939–2001), Catholic priest accused of sexual abuse and murder
 James N. Mathias, Jr., Maryland legislator; former mayor of Ocean City, Maryland
 Jack McClinton (born 1985), professional basketball player
 Gary Neal, former NBA player for multiple teams, most notably the San Antonio Spurs
 Samuel J. Palmisano, chairman, CEO, and president of IBM
 Thomas Roberts, news anchor
 Dwight Schultz, actor
 Rick Trainor, academic, educator
 Heath Tarbert, nominee for Assistant Secretary of the Treasury for International Markets and Development in the U.S. (2017)
 Sean Tucker, football player
 Trevor Williams, football player
 George Young, former general manager of the NFL's New York Giants
 John Waters Actor, writer, filmmaker, artist

See also

National Catholic Educational Association

References

External links

Calvert Hall official website
Roman Catholic Archdiocese of Baltimore

Educational institutions established in 1845
Catholic secondary schools in Maryland
Lasallian schools in the United States
Private schools in Baltimore County, Maryland
Middle States Commission on Secondary Schools
Boys' schools in the United States
Towson, Maryland
1845 establishments in Maryland